The Boonton Public Library, also known as the Holmes Library, is located at 619 Main Street in the town of Boonton in Morris County, New Jersey. Built , the Greek Revival building was purchased by James Holmes in 1856 and became the public library in 1893.  It was added to the National Register of Historic Places on November 13, 1972, for its significance in communications, education, and social history. It was added as a contributing property to the Boonton Historic District on September 29, 1980.

History and description
In 1849, Eliza Ann Scott purchased the lot on the corner of Main and Church streets from the New Jersey Iron Company and soon built a two-story building, which was apparently used for commerce. In 1856, she sold it for $5,000 to James Holmes (1815–1893), who was superintendent of the Taylor & Lord Nail Factory and one of the wealthiest individuals in the community. He then used the building as his residence and  added a third story. Upon his death in 1893, the property was bequeathed to the Boonton Public Library Association, along with $8,000 to fund its operation. Since the building was larger than the library needed, the extra space was rented to various organizations. In 1895, printing presses for The Boonton Times were installed in the basement.  The library has been serving the town since 1894.

See also
 National Register of Historic Places listings in Morris County, New Jersey

References

External links
 
 
 

Boonton, New Jersey
National Register of Historic Places in Morris County, New Jersey
Libraries on the National Register of Historic Places in New Jersey
Historic district contributing properties in New Jersey
Historic district contributing properties in Morris County, New Jersey
Individually listed contributing properties to historic districts on the National Register in New Jersey
Greek Revival architecture in New Jersey
Buildings and structures completed in 1849
Buildings and structures in Morris County, New Jersey
New Jersey Register of Historic Places
Public libraries in New Jersey
Library buildings completed in 1893